John Cannon "J. L." Black (June 27, 1933 – November 25, 2017) was an American politician who served in the Georgia Senate between 1994 and 1996.

Born in 1933 to Aubrey and Bessie Black, John Black joined the United States Air Force during the Korean War and later served in the Army. Prior to his election to the state senate, Black worked for Combustion Engineering, and in later life became pastor of the Trinity Holiness Church. He married Delma Lee York in 1957, with whom he had three children Aubrey Lee Black, Annette Black Anderson and Janice Kay Black Parker.

References

1933 births
2017 deaths
Georgia (U.S. state) state senators
United States Army soldiers
United States Air Force officers
United States Air Force personnel of the Korean War